Tarita Teriipaia (born 29 December 1941) is a French retired actress of French Polynesian and Chinese descent who was the third wife of actor Marlon Brando; the couple  divorced in 1972. For media and entertainment appearances and engagements, she has usually been billed as Tarita.

Biography
Born in Bora Bora, French Polynesia, she played Maimiti opposite Marlon Brando in the film Mutiny on the Bounty (1962), for which she received a Golden Globe nomination for Best Supporting Actress. She became Brando's third wife in 1962. She is the mother of two of Brando's children, a son, Simon Teihotu (born in 1963) and a daughter, Tarita Cheyenne (1970-1995). They divorced in 1972. Only months after Marlon Brando's death in 2004, Tarita published her memoirs titled Marlon, My Love and My Torment. She is the only wife of Brando still alive, after Movita Castaneda and Anna Kashfi died on 12 February and 16 August 2015, respectively.

See also 
 Tetiꞌaroa

References

External links

1941 births
Living people
French Polynesian actresses
French Polynesian people of Chinese descent
20th-century French actresses
People from Bora Bora
Brando family